This is a bibliography of major works on Nova Scotia.

Bibliography

Surveys
  Beck, J. Murray.  The Government of Nova Scotia University of Toronto Press, 1957, the standard history
 Choyce, Lesley.  Nova Scotia: Shaped by the Sea. A Living History. Toronto: Penguin Books Canada, 1996. 305 pp.
 Conrad, Margaret. At the Ocean's Edge: A History of Nova Scotia to Confederation (U of Toronto Press, 2020).
 Girard, Philip; Phillips, Jim; and Cahill, Barry, ed.  The Supreme Court of Nova Scotia, 1754-2004: From Imperial Bastion to Provincial Oracle U. of Toronto Press 2004.
  Johnson, Ralph S.  Forests of Nova Scotia: A History. Tantallon: Nova Scotia Dept. of Lands and Forests; Four East Publ., 1986. 407 pp.

Localities
 Donovan, Kenneth, ed.  Cape Breton at 200: Historical Essays in Honour of the Island's Bicentennial, 1785-1985. Sydney, N.S.: U. Coll. of Cape Breton Pr., 1985. 261 pp.
  Fingard, Judith; Guildford, Janet; and Sutherland, David.  Halifax: The First 250 Years Halifax: Formac, 1999. 192 pp.
 Loomer, L. S.  Windsor, Nova Scotia: A Journey in History. Windsor, N.S.: West Hants Hist. Soc., 1996. 399 pp.
  Robertson, Allen B.  Tide & Timber: Hantsport, Nova Scotia, 1795-1995. Hantsport, N.S.: Lancelot, 1996. 182 pp.

Special topics
 Beaton, Jim, and Eleanor Meek.  Offshore Dream: A History of Nova Scotia's Oil and Gas Industry (2010) 
 Campey, Lucille H. After the Hector: The Scottish Pioneers of Nova Scotia and Cape Breton, 1773-1852 (Dundurn, 2007)
 Campey, Lucille H. Planters, Paupers, and Pioneers: English Settlers in Atlantic Canada (2010) 
 Girard, Philip; Phillips, Jim; and Cahill, Barry, ed.  The Supreme Court of Nova Scotia, 1754-2004: From Imperial Bastion to Provincial Oracle U. of Toronto Press 2004.
  Johnson, Ralph S.  Forests of Nova Scotia: A History. Tantallon: Nova Scotia Dept. of Lands and Forests; Four East Publ., 1986. 407 pp.
  Robertson, Barbara R.  Sawpower: Making Lumber in the Sawmills of Nova Scotia. Halifax: Nimbus; Nova Scotia Mus., 1986. 244 pp.

Historiography
 McKay, Ian,  and Robin Bates, eds. In the Province of History: The Making of the Public Past in Twentieth-Century Nova Scotia (2010)  excerpt and text search

Since 1900
  Beck, J. Murray.  Politics of Nova Scotia. vol 2:  1896-1988. Tantallon, N.S.: Four East 1985 438 pp.
  Bickerton, James P.  Nova Scotia, Ottawa and the Politics of Regional Development. U. of Toronto Press 1990. 412 pp.
 Creighton, Wilfred.  Forestkeeping: A History of the Department of Lands and Forests in Nova Scotia, 1926-1969. Halifax: Nova Scotia Dept. of Lands and Forests, 1988. 155 pp.
  Earle, Michael, ed.  Workers and the State in Twentieth Century Nova Scotia. Fredericton: Acadiensis, 1989.
  Frank, David.  J. B. McLachlan: A Biography - the Story of a Legendary Labour Leader and the Cape Breton Coal Miners. Toronto: Lorimer, 1999. 592 pp.
 Fraser, Dawn.  Echoes from Labor's Wars: The Expanded Edition, Industrial Cape Breton in the 1920s, Echoes of World War One, Autobiography and Other Writings. Wreck Cove, N.S.: Breton Books, 1992. 177 pp.

 McKay, Ian.  The Quest of the Folk: Antimodernism and Cultural Selection in Twentieth-Century Nova Scotia. McGill-Queen's U. Pr., 1994. 371 pp.
  McKay, Ian.  The Craft Transformed: An Essay on the Carpenters of Halifax, 1885-1985. Halifax, N.S.: Holdfast, 1985. 148 pp.
 March, William DesB.  Red Line: The Chronicle-Herald and Mail-Star, 1875-1954. Halifax, N.S.: Chebucto Agencies, 1986. 415 pp.
 Morton, Suzanne.  Ideal Surroundings: Domestic Life in a Working-Class Suburb in the 1920s. U. of Toronto Pr., 1995. 201 pp.  about Richmond Heights
 Sandberg, L. Anders and Clancy, Peter.  Against the Grain: Foresters and Politics in Nova Scotia. U. of British Columbia Pr., 2000. 352 pp.
 Sandberg, L. Anders, ed.  Trouble in the Woods: Forest Policy and Social Conflict in Nova Scotia and New Brunswick. Fredericton, N.B.: Acadiensis, 1992. 234 pp.

Pre 1900
  Beck, J. Murray.   Joseph Howe Volumes I & II : Conservative Reformer 1804-1848; The Briton Becomes Canadian 1848-1873 (1984)
  Beck, J. Murray.  Politics of Nova Scotia. vol 1 1710-1896 Tantallon, N.S.: Four East 1985 438 pp.
 Bell, Winthrop P.  The "Foreign Protestants" and the Settlement of Nova Scotia: The History of a Piece of Arrested British Colonial Policy in the Eighteenth Century. (1961). reprint Fredericton, N.B.: Acadiensis for Mount Allison U., Cen. for Can. Studies, 1990. 673 pp.
  Brebner, John Bartlet. New England's Outpost. Acadia before the Conquest of Canada (1927)
  Brebner, John Bartlet. The Neutral Yankees of Nova Scotia: A Marginal Colony During the Revolutionary Years (1937)
 Byers, Mary and McBurney, Margaret.  Atlantic Hearth: Early Homes and Families of Nova Scotia. U. of Toronto Press, 1994. 364 pp.
 Campey, Lucille H.  After the Hector: The Scottish Pioneers of Nova Scotia and Cape Breton Toronto: Natural Heritage Books, 2004. 376 pp.
 J. A. Chisholm, ed. Speeches and Public Letters of Joseph Howe 2 vol Halifax, 1909
 Conrad, Margaret and Moody, Barry, ed.  Planter Links: Community and Culture in Colonial Nova Scotia. Fredericton, : Acadiensis, 2001. 236 pp.
 Conrad, Margaret, ed. Intimate Relations: Family and Community in Planter Nova Scotia, 1759-1800. Fredericton, : Acadiensis, 1995. 298 pp.
 Conrad, Margaret, ed.  Making Adjustments: Change and Continuity in Planter Nova Scotia, 1759-1800. Fredericton: Acadiensis, 1991. 280 pp.
 Cuthbertson, Brian.  Johnny Bluenose at the Polls: Epic Nova Scotian Election Battles, 1758-1848. Halifax: Formac, 1994. 344 pp.
 Donald A. Desserud; "Outpost's Response: The Language and Politics of Moderation in Eighteenth-Century Nova Scotia" American Review of Canadian Studies, Vol. 29, 1999  online
 
 Frost, James D.  Merchant Princes: Halifax's First Family of Finance, Ships, and Steel Toronto: Lorimer, 2003. 376 pp.
 Gwyn, Julian.  Excessive Expectations: Maritime Commerce and the Economic Development of Nova Scotia, 1740-1870 McGill-Queen's U. Pr., 1998. 291 pp.
 
 Hornsby, Stephen J.  Nineteenth-Century Cape Breton: A Historical Geography. McGill-Queen's U. Pr., 1992. 274 pp.
 (Canada),  (USA)

 Paperback Edition
  Krause, Eric; Corbin, Carol; and O'Shea, William, ed. Aspects of Louisbourg: Essays on the History of an Eighteenth-Century French Community in North America. Sydney, N.S.: U. Coll. of Cape Breton Pr., 1995. 312 pp.
  Lanctôt, Léopold.  L'Acadie des Origines, 1603-1771 Montreal: Fleuve, 1988. 234 pp.
 LeBlanc, Ronnie-Gilles (2005). Du Grand Dérangement à la Déportation: Nouvelles Perspectives Historiques, Moncton: Université de Moncton, 465 pages (book in French and English)
  McKay, Ian.  The Craft Transformed: An Essay on the Carpenters of Halifax, 1885-1985. Halifax, N.S.: Holdfast, 1985. 148 pp.
 MacKinnon, Neil.  This Unfriendly Soil: The Loyalist Experience in Nova Scotia, 1783-1791.  McGill-Queen's U. Press, 1986. 231 pp.
 Mancke, Elizabeth.  The Fault Lines of Empire: Political Differentiation in Massachusetts and Nova Scotia, ca. 1760-1830 Routledge, 2005. 214 pp.  online
 Marble, Allan Everett.  Surgeons, Smallpox, and the Poor: A History of Medicine and Social Conditions in Nova Scotia, 1749-1799. McGill-Queen's U. Pr., 1993. 356 pp.
 Pryke, Kenneth G. Nova Scotia and Confederation, 1864-74 (1979)
 
  Waite, P. B.  The Lives of Dalhousie University. Vol. 1: 1818-1925, Lord Dalhousie's College. McGill-Queen's U. Press, 1994. 338 pp.
 Walker, James W. St. G.  The Black Loyalists: The Search for a Promised Land in Nova Scotia and Sierra Leone, 1783-1870. (1976). reprint U. of Toronto Press, 1992. 438 pp
 Whitelaw, William Menzies; The Maritimes and Canada before Confederation (1934) online

19th century histories 
 Barrington History
 Digby County
Annapolis Valley
Kings County
 Minas Basin
Queen's County

See also

Bibliography of Canada
Bibliography of Canadian history
Bibliography of Saskatchewan history
Bibliography of Alberta history
Bibliography of British Columbia
Bibliography of the 1837-1838 insurrections in Lower Canada
List of books about the War of 1812

 
Nova Scotia